George Merrick Rice (November 20, 1808 – November 10, 1894) was an American businessman from Worcester, Massachusetts who had a varied career in dry goods and grain retailing and the manufacture of industrial machinery.  He was a pioneer in the steel industry.  He was also a banker, serving as president of the Worcester Safe Deposit and Trust Company.  He was president of the Worcester Common Council for three years and was a member of the Massachusetts State Senate from 1869 to 1870.

Biography
George Merrick Rice was born in West Brookfield, Massachusetts on 20 Nov 1808 to Col. Samuel Buckminster Rice and Abigail (Bradish) Rice. He attended public schools in West Brookfield, and after serving as a clerk for a few years in a country store in Leicester, Massachusetts, he moved to Worcester in 1829 and became a partner in the dry goods firm Andrew, March and Company. Shortly afterwards, he purchased the dry goods business of Burt and Merrick in 1830 and a few years later he purchased a flour and grain store near the end of the Blackstone Canal in Worcester. In 1846, he became a partner in the firm of Howe, Goddard and Company (H.P. Howe and Isaac Goddard) in the manufacture of calico printing and bleaching machinery. This company eventually became the Rice, Barton, and Fales Machinery and Iron Company. He became the president of the Worcester Steel Works in 1882, installing a Bessemer steel plant in 1884, with expanded operations producing as much as 230 tons of steel per day after addition of an open hearth steel furnace. The business operated for 30 years in Worcester and was one of the largest businesses in the city, entering bankruptcy in 1890. He also served as president of the Worcester Safe Deposit and Trust Company and president of the Manufacturers Mutual Insurance Company.

Rice was active in Republican Party politics in Massachusetts, serving in the Worcester Common Council and as the Common Council President for three years. He was elected to the Massachusetts Senate in the elections of 1868, serving from 1869 to 1870, and was very active in the temperance movement. He died 10 Nov 1894 in Worcester, Massachusetts and was buried at Worcester Rural Cemetery.

Family relations
Rice was a direct descendant of Edmund Rice, an early immigrant to Massachusetts Bay Colony as follows: His father Col. Samuel Buckminster Rice was a member of the Massachusetts militia and a Massachusetts State Representative in 1813 and 1816.

 George Merrick Rice, son of
 Col. Samuel Buckminster Rice (1760–1828), son of
 Capt. Tilly Rice (1724–1803), son of
 Obadiah Rice (1698–1761) son of
 Jacob Rice (1660–1746), son of
 Edward Rice (1622–1712), son of
 Edmund Rice (c.1594–1663)

See also

 1869 Massachusetts legislature
 1870 Massachusetts legislature

References 

Republican Party Massachusetts state senators
1808 births
1894 deaths
People from Worcester, Massachusetts
American bankers
People from West Brookfield, Massachusetts
People from Leicester, Massachusetts
19th-century American politicians
19th-century American businesspeople